Aqualysin 1 (caldolysin) is an enzyme. This enzyme catalyses the following chemical reaction

 Exhibits low specificity towards esters of amino acids with small hydrophobic or aromatic residues at the P1 position

This enzyme is isolated from the thermophile, Thermus aquaticus.

References

External links 
 

EC 3.4.21